The Bayon is a Khmer temple at Angkor in Cambodia.

Bayon may also refer to:
 Bayon, Meurthe-et-Moselle, a village and commune in northeastern France
 Bayon, name for the upper part of the Bayeux (river), a short stream in the southeastern France
 Bayon (band), a band from Germany
 Bayon Television, a television and radio operator in Cambodia

People with the surname
 Eugène Bayon, French Olympic sprinter
 Henry Peter Bayon (1876-1952), Italian Italian pathologist and science historian
 Madeleine Bayon, French acrobatic gymnast
 Mariana Bayón (born 1991), Mexican model
 Marie Emmanuelle Bayon Louis (1746–1825), French composer, pianist, and salonnière
 Samuel Bayón (born 1983), Spanish association football player

See also
 Bayon-sur-Gironde, a commune in the Gironde department in southwestern France
 Bayons, a commune in the Alpes-de-Haute-Provence department in southeastern France
 Laneuveville-devant-Bayon, a village and commune in the Meurthe-et-Moselle département of north-eastern France
 Roville-devant-Bayon, a village and commune in the Meurthe-et-Moselle département of north-eastern France
 Saint-Antonin-sur-Bayon, a commune in the Bouches-du-Rhône department in southern France